Deng Prefecture was a prefecture of imperial China centering on modern Penglai, Shandong, China. It existed intermittently from 596 until 1376.

Geography
The administrative region of Deng Prefecture in the Tang dynasty is in modern northeastern Shandong. It probably includes parts of modern: 
Under the administration of Yantai:
Yantai
Penglai
Longkou
Qixia
Under the administration of Weihai:
Weihai
Rushan
Rongcheng

Legacy
The former name of the area is preserved in Penglai's Dengzhou Subdistrict.

See also
Other Dengzhous
Dongmu Commandery

References
 

Prefectures of Later Han (Five Dynasties)
Prefectures of the Tang dynasty
Prefectures of the Sui dynasty
Prefectures of Later Tang
Prefectures of Later Liang (Five Dynasties)
Prefectures of Later Jin (Five Dynasties)
Prefectures of the Song dynasty
Former prefectures in Shandong
Prefectures of Later Zhou
Prefectures of the Jin dynasty (1115–1234)
Prefectures of the Yuan dynasty